Sanchar is an Indian Marathi daily broadsheet newspaper based in Solapur, India. It was founded by Shri M B Kadadi, Ranga Vaidya & Raman Gandhi on 13 October 1961, and is currently owned by Sangam Papers Corporation. The current Editor, Printer, Publisher of "Sanchar" is Mr. Dharmraj Annaraj Kadadi. Mr Annaraj Dharmraj Kadadi & Smt Sushila Raman Gandhi are the other Partners in Sangam Papers Corporation. The office of "Sanchar" is situated at Sanchar Building, Hotgi Road, Solapur 413003 (Maharashtra, India)

References

External links
 Official website

Solapur
Marathi-language newspapers
Newspapers published in Maharashtra
Asian news websites
1961 establishments in Maharashtra
Publications established in 1961